Maksim Maksimovich Shtraukh (1900–1974) was a Soviet and Russian film and theater actor. He was awarded the People's Artist of the USSR in 1965, Lenin Prize and Stalin Prize between 1950 and 1951.

He is known for playing Vladimir Lenin on stage and in film. He has privilege to get discount for V. I. Lenin bust on any USSR shop.

Selected filmography 
 1923 – Glumov's Diary
1924 – Strike
1929 – The General Line
 1929 – The Ghost That Never Returns
1930 – The Civil Servant
 1933 – The Deserter
1933 – The Conveyor of Death
1934 – The Four Visits of Samuel Wolfe
1936 – A Severe Young Man
 1938 – Doctor Aybolit
 1938 – The Man with the Gun
 1938 – The Vyborg Side
 1940 – Yakov Sverdlov
1942 – His Name Is Sukhe-Bator
1943 – Two Soldiers
1943 – The Young Fritz
1946 – The Vow
1947 – Light over Russia
1948 – The Court of Honor
1949 – The Battle of Stalingrad
1949 – The Fall of Berlin
1950 – Conspiracy of the Doomed
1956 – Murder on Dante Street
1957 – Stories About Lenin
 1957 – Leningrad Symphony
 1965 – Lenin in Poland

References

External links 
 
 Maya Turovskaya, Boris Medvedev. Энергия мысли. Mайя Туровская и Борис Медведев о Максиме Штраухе (1952)
 

1900 births
1974 deaths
Male actors from Moscow
Honored Artists of the RSFSR
People's Artists of the RSFSR
People's Artists of the USSR
Stalin Prize winners
Lenin Prize winners
Recipients of the Order of Lenin
Recipients of the Order of the Red Banner of Labour
Soviet theatre directors
Soviet male actors
Soviet male film actors
Soviet male stage actors
Vladimir Lenin
Burials at Novodevichy Cemetery